The Secwépemc (Secwepemc:  or ), known in English as the Shuswap people , are a First Nations people residing in the interior of the Canadian province of British Columbia. They speak one of the Salishan languages, known as Secwepemc or Shuswap.

Secwepemcúĺecw, their territory, ranges from the eastern Chilcotin Plateau and the Cariboo Plateau southeast through Thompson Country to Kamloops and Shuswap Country. It spans the Selkirk Mountains and Big Bend of the Columbia River to include the northern part of the Columbia Valley region. Their traditional territory covers approximately 145,000 square kilometres. Traditionally they depended on hunting, trading and fishing to support their communities.

History, language and culture
They speak one of the Salishan languages. Based on the number of people who speak their Shuswap language, the Secwepemc are likely the most numerous of the Interior Salish peoples of British Columbia.

Their traditional language is Shuswap, also known as Secwepemctsín. In the early 21st century, it is spoken by more than 1,600 people. The First Nation is working to revitalize use of this language. For instance, Secwepemctsín is being taught in Chief Atahm School, which offers an immersion program to students from K-9. In addition, Simon Fraser University offers a University studies program teaching students Secwepemc language and culture. The program focuses on the language, culture, and traditions of the Secwepemc people.

The Secwepemc have always stressed the importance of recognizing their title to the land. In 1910, the Secwepemc Chiefs addressed a memorial to Prime Minister Laurier. Their paper laid out the cumulative grievances of the Secwepemc, based on the previous 50 years of European-Canadian settlement in their territory. Since the late 20th century, the Secwepmc people have created a number of organizations, institutions, and initiatives to help their people, including the Shuswap Nation Tribal Council and Secwepemc Cultural Education Society.

Captive slaves were historically an important commodity to the Secwepemc, and the Secwepemc would raid other bands, and then sell the captives back in exchange for salmon.  Very few captives were kept as household slaves.

Traditional Shuswap tribal divisions and bands 
 Setlemuk (Setlomuk, Sétlhemx) or Cañon Division, or Canyon Shuswap, west of the Fraser River, from about Churn Creek to beyond Riske Creek. Subdivisions: Riskie Creek, North Canyon, South Canyon, Chilcotin Mouth. The 1862 Pacific Northwest smallpox epidemic almost wiped out the Canyon Shuswap. The survivors joined with the Alkali Lake band (Esketemc).
 Skstellnemuk (Sxstélenemx) or Shuswap Lake Division, on the Upper South Thompson River, Shuswap Lake, and Spallumcheen River. Subdivisions: South Thompson, Adams Lake (now Sexqeltqin), Shuswap Lake, Spallumcheen, Arrow Lake. Now known as the Neskonlith Indian Band.
 Stietamuk (Styétemx, "interior people") or Lake Division, the interior of the plateau between Fraser and North Thompson rivers. Subdivisions: Lake la Hache, Green Timber, and Canim Lake (Tsq'escen'). Only the last band survived the diseases of the 1800s, absorbing the surviving members of the Green Timber band. The few survivors of the Lac La Hache band merged with the Williams Lake Band (T’exelcemc)
 Stkamlulepsemuk or Kamloops Division, the people of Kamloops and Savona. Subdivisions: Savona or Deadman's Creek, Kamloops (Stkamluleps).
 Stlemhulehamuk or Fraser River Division, in the valley of Fraser River from High Bar to Soda Creek, including the people of Clinton. Subdivisions: Soda Creek, Buckskin Creek, Williams Lake (T'exelc) or Sugar Cane, Alkali Lake (Esketemc), Dog Creek, Canoe Creek, Empire Valley, Big Bar, High Bar (Llenlleney'ten), Clinton.
 Texqa'kallt (Tqéqeltkemx) or North Thompson Division, people of the North Thompson region. Subdivisions: Upper North Thompson, Lower North Thompson, Kinbaskets. The Kinbasket or Kenpésqt are an offshoot of the Upper North Thompson and Shuswap Lake division, and are now called the Shuswap band Kenpesq't
 Zaktcinemuk (Sexcinemx) or Bonaparte Division, in the valley of the Bonaparte River to near Ashcroft on the main Thompson, Cache Creek, Loon Lake, the lower part of Hat Creek, through Marble Canyon to Pavilion, and on both sides of the Fraser River near that point. Subdivisions: Pavilion (Ts'kw'aylaxw First Nation), Bonaparte River (now Stuctwesecm, "people of Stuctuws"), and Main Thompson (Snekwaˀetkwemx), who became extinct as a people during the late 19th centuryref name=" Swanton"/>

Notable Secwépemc people
Darrell Dennis, comedian, actor, screenwriter and radio personality
Grace Dove, actress and television host
Arthur Manuel, political leader and activist (George Manuel's son)
George Manuel, president of the National Indian Brotherhood and founding president of the World Council of Indigenous Peoples
Vera Manuel, poet and playwright (George Manuel's daughter)
Bev Sellars, writer and activist
Phyllis Webstad, author and creator of Orange Shirt Day
Tania Willard, curator and artist

See also
Shuswap Nation Tribal Council
Northern Shuswap Tribal Council
Secwepemc Museum and Heritage Park
Secwepemc Cultural Education Society
Handbook of North American Indians, Volume 12

Notes

External links
Secwepemculecw - Land of the Shuswap
 Cultural Education Society
 Chief Atahm Immersion School
 Spirit Map- language history and culture of the Secwepemc
 
 Notes on the Shuswap People of British Columbia, s.L.: S.n., 1980, George M. Dawson

 
Interior Salish